

Friedrich-Jobst Volckamer von Kirchensittenbach (16 April 1894 – 3 April 1989) was a German general in the Wehrmacht of Nazi Germany during World War II who commanded the 16th Army. He was a recipient of the Knight's Cross of the Iron Cross.

Kirchensittenbach surrendered to the Red Army in 1945 in the Courland Pocket. Convicted as a war criminal in the Soviet Union, he was held until 1955.

Awards and decorations

 Knight's Cross of the Iron Cross on 26 March 1944 as Generalleutnant and commander of 8. Jäger Division

References

Citations

Bibliography

 

1894 births
1989 deaths
People from Oberallgäu
People from the Kingdom of Bavaria
German Army personnel of World War I
Military personnel from Bavaria
Recipients of the clasp to the Iron Cross, 1st class
Recipients of the Gold German Cross
Recipients of the Knight's Cross of the Iron Cross
German prisoners of war in World War II held by the Soviet Union
Generals of Mountain Troops